Mothpur is a village and gram panchayat located in Atru Tehsil of Baran district, Rajasthan, India. Mothpur is a medium-sized village with a total of 851 families residing there. It comes under Atru Tehsil, which is about 22 kilometers away from Mothpur.

Population 
Mothpur village has a population of 4497, according to the Population Census of 2011. Out of the total population, 2332 are males while 2165 are females.

References

Gram Panchayats and Villages in Atru Tehsil